Togasilimai Letoa (born 16 April 1982) is Samoan professional boxer. 

Letoa has fought for six regional belts in his career, including winning the WBC – OPBF Light Heavyweight title against Manny Vlamis. Letoa is the first Samoan National Light Heavyweight Champion, winning the title against Miki Otto Ropati in 2009.

Professional boxing titles
Samoa
Samoa National light heavyweight title (174½ Ibs)
World Boxing Council  
OPBF light heavyweight title (172 Ibs)

Professional boxing record

References

1982 births
Living people
Samoan male boxers
Light-heavyweight boxers